"Boneless" is a song by the American record producer Steve Aoki, the British record producer Chris Lake and the German record producer Tujamo, courtesy of and in association with the original producer and composer Aid Vllasaliu. The song was named after the skateboarding trick of the same name. It was released on August 23, 2013, by Dim Mak Records and Ultra Records. The single received success through various dance charts in Europe; it peaked on the overall singles charts at number 49 in Germany, number 42 in Austria and number 44 in Belgium (Wallonia). A vocal version of the song featuring the vocals of hip-hop recording artist Kid Ink was released the following year.

Artistic gymnasts Angi Cipra and Ellie Downie have used the song for their floor music, with Downie winning the all-around at the 2017 European Artistic Gymnastics Championships while performing to the track.

The song also appeared in an Alexander Wang fashion show in September 2014.

It has also been used by the Atlanta Braves as a home run song.

Music video
The music video for "Boneless" was recorded at and takes place in Venice Beach, Los Angeles. In the video, Chris Lake ("The Scribbler") and Steve "Benihana" Aoki star as the heads of two different skate gangs known as "The Rampants" and "The Dimmaks". The two groups have a skate-off. The video was directed by Peter Falloon a.k.a. The Bear, who worked with Monument Media to deliver the 1980s skater-inspired video.

Track listing

Charts

Weekly charts

Year-end charts

Certifications

Release history

Delirious (Boneless)

A vocal version of the song, entitled "Delirious (Boneless)", was released on June 3, 2014 as the second single from Steve Aoki's second studio album Neon Future.I. This version features rapper Kid Ink and was co-written by Erin Beck, Whitney Phillips, Jenson Vaughan, and Aid "Valsal" Vllasaliu. The song was featured in the soundtrack of the 2014 film Step Up: All In (as well as Aoki's previous single "Rage the Night Away"), the song was also featured on the 2015 film Furious 7 (although it is not included in the film's soundtrack album. However, it is featured on the deluxe edition of the soundtrack). The song was featured in the 2017 film Smurfs: The Lost Village and 2019 film Men in Black: International. The song was also featured in the trailer and TV spots of the 2016 film War Dogs, the 2017 film Captain Underpants: The First Epic Movie and the 2022 film Paws of Fury: The Legend of Hank.

Music video
A year after the original song's release, the official lyric video for "Delirious (Boneless)" was published to YouTube on August 27, 2014. The "Delirious" version was also given its own music video, which was directed by Golden Wolf and published to YouTube on October 9.

Track listing

Charts

Weekly charts

Year-end charts

Certifications

Release history

References

2013 singles
2013 songs
2014 singles
Steve Aoki songs
Chris Lake songs
Tujamo songs
Kid Ink songs
Ultra Music singles
Songs written by Steve Aoki
Songs written by Kid Ink
Songs written by Jenson Vaughan
Songs written by Whitney Phillips
Songs written by Erin Beck